Giovanni di Apparecchiato, also called il Nuccaro (circa 1300) was an Italian painter of the Gothic period in Pisa.

Biography
He was born in Lucca. He helped Cimabue paint an altarpiece for the altar of Santo Spirito in the church of Santa Chiara in Pisa. He also painted in 1299 a fresco in the Deputation room of the Palazzo dell'Opera facing the Piazza dei Miracoli in Pisa.

References

13th-century Italian painters
Italian male painters
14th-century Italian painters
Year of birth unknown
Year of death unknown
Painters from Tuscany